Križni Vrh (meaning "Cross Peak") is a Slovene place name that may refer to:

Križni Vrh, Mokronog-Trebelno, a village in the Municipality of Mokronog–Trebelno, southeastern Slovenia
Križni Vrh, Slovenska Bistrica, a village in the Municipality of Slovenska Bistrica, northeastern Slovenia